My Shocking Story is a documentary television series originally broadcast on Discovery Channel UK. It was broadcast by The Learning Channel in the United States, Discovery Channel Australia and Seven Network in Australia and Discovery Channel Italy in Italy. The series documents unusual or shocking medical ailments and conditions.

Episodes

Series One
 "Half-Man Half-tree
 "World's Fattest Kids"
 "My Big Foot"
 "The Man With No Face"
 "World's Smallest Mom"
 "World's Smallest Kids"

Series Two
 "Octoboy"
 "Human Spider Sisters", about the Spider Girls, conjoined twins from India
 "Treeman Meets Treeman"
 "World's Tallest Giants"
 "Albino Crisis"
 "Giant Head"
 "Treeman: Search for The Cure"
 "Human Face Transplant"
 "Real Wolf Kids"
 "Octopus Man"
 "Electric Human"
 "Freak Show Family"
 "Coma Miracle"
 "Burnt And Survived"
 "Which Sex Am I?"
 "World's Heaviest Man"
 "Reconstruct My Face"
 "Can't Stop Growing"
 "Rewire My Brain"
 "Save Me Before I'm Born"
 "Sleep Sex"

External links

Naked and Afraid TV Show

2006 British television series debuts
2010 British television series endings
2000s British medical television series
2010s British medical television series
Discovery Channel original programming
TLC (TV network) original programming
British documentary television series
English-language television shows